Montenegro competed at the 2018 Winter Olympics in Pyeongchang, South Korea, from 9 to 25 February 2018, with three competitors in two sports.

Competitors
The following is the list of number of competitors participating in the delegation per sport.

Alpine skiing 

Montenegro qualified two athletes, one male and one female.

Cross-country skiing 

Montenegro qualified one female athlete. The country will be making its debut in the sport at the Winter Olympics.

Distance

See also
Montenegro at the 2018 Summer Youth Olympics

References

Nations at the 2018 Winter Olympics
2018
2018 in Montenegrin sport